The Yuchi are a Native American tribe.

Yuchi may also refer to:
Yuchi language, language of the Yuchi people
Yuchi (surname), Chinese compound surname of Xianbei origin
Yuchi, Nantou, rural township in Taiwan
Yūchi Station, railway station in Wakkanai, Hokkaidō, Japan

See also